Chambers Corners or Chambers Corner may refer to:

Chambers Corner, New Jersey
Chambers Corners, Ontario